Edward Dryhurst (1904–1989) was an English screenwriter, film producer and director.

Selected filmography
Screenwriter
 Three Men in a Cart (1929)
 Find the Lady (1936)
 The End of the Road (1936)
 Jennifer Hale (1937)
 East of Ludgate Hill (1937)
 Double Alibi (1937)
 Flying Fortress (1942)
 Bell Bottom George (1943)
 The Man from Morocco (1945)
 Master of Bankdam (1947)
 Castle in the Air (1952)
 It's Never Too Late (1956)
 Stranger in Town (1957)

Director
 The Woman from China (1930)
 Commissionaire (1933)

References

External links
 
 

1904 births
1989 deaths
English film producers
People from Desborough
20th-century English businesspeople